Atzmon is a communal settlement in Gush Segev in the Galilee region of Israel.

Atzmon may also refer to:

People with the surname 
 Anat Atzmon (born 1958)
 Gilad Atzmon (born 1963), Israeli musician and author
 Moshe Atzmon (born 1931, Budapest), Jewish Hungarian-Israeli conductor
 Yitzhak Atzmon, Israeli actor who starred in the film Buzz

Places 
 Bnei Atzmon, also Atzmona, a former Israeli settlement on the Sinai peninsula

Related words 
 Azmon (another spelling)
 Atzmona (female form)

Hebrew-language surnames